Vosnesenya, (also known as Visnesinia) is a former Doukhobor settlement in Livingston Rural Municipality No. 331, Saskatchewan, Canada, north-east of the village of Arran along the Swan River.

The area around Vosnesenya was part of the "North Reserve", or the "Thunder Hill Reserve", one of the block settlement areas allocated for the Doukhobor immigrants who arrived here in 1899 from Russia's Transcaucasian provinces.

See also 

 List of communities in Saskatchewan
 Doukhobor Russian
 Block settlement
 Doukhobor

References

External links 

Unincorporated communities in Saskatchewan
Livingston No. 331, Saskatchewan
Ethnic enclaves in Canada
Ethnic enclaves in Saskatchewan
Doukhobors
Division No. 9, Saskatchewan